The following are the Pulitzer Prizes for 1920.

Journalism awards
Reporting:
John J. Leary, Jr. of New York World, for the series of articles written during the national coal strike in the winter of 1919.
Editorial Writing:
Harvey E. Newbranch of Evening World Herald for an editorial entitled "Law and the Jungle".

Letters and Drama Awards
Drama:
Beyond the Horizon by Eugene O'Neill (Boni)
History:
The War with Mexico by Justin Harvey Smith (Macmillan)
Biography or Autobiography:
The Life of John Marshall by Albert J. Beveridge (Houghton)

External links
Pulitzer Prizes for 1920

Pulitzer Prizes by year
Pulitzer Prize
Pulitzer Prize